Boxberg Power Station (in German commonly referred as Kraftwerk Boxberg) is a lignite-fired power station with three units at Boxberg, near Weißwasser, Saxony, Eastern Germany. Since the late 1990s, it has a capacity of 1,900 MW.

In 2001, it was acquired by Vattenfall Europe, a subdivision of Vattenfall.  The power station was sold by Vattenfall to the Czech energy group EPH and its financial partner PPF Investments on 30September 2016.

History 

Like Jänschwalde Power Station and Schwarze Pumpe Power Station, Boxberg Power Station was built at a place surrounded by surface mines. The first unit was built in 1966, in the 1980s there were 14 units with an accumulated output of 3,520 MW.

After the German reunification twelve units (210 MW each) went off, and two units, 500 MW each, were modernized. In the mid-1990s, a new 900 MW unit was built, another 675 MW unit is projected for the end of 2012.

Size 

Boxberg Power Station had four chimneys 300 metres tall. One was dismantled in 2000, two were blasted in 2009, and the last one was projected to be completely demolished in 2010 but problems during the process of demolishing delayed that project, it was blasted in 2012.

References

External links 

 
Data sheet by Vattenfall Europe (in German)

Energy infrastructure completed in 1966
Towers completed in 1966
Buildings and structures in Görlitz (district)
Chimneys in Germany
Coal-fired power stations in Germany
Vattenfall
power station
Energetický a průmyslový holding